Sumbat I (died 958) was a Georgian prince of the Bagrationi dynasty of Tao-Klarjeti, hereditary ruler of Lower Tao and the titular king of Iberia from 937 until his death.

Sumbat was the youngest son of Adarnase IV. He was a younger brother of David II upon whose death he succeeded as “King of the Iberians” in 937, and of Ashot II upon whose death he succeeded as the Byzantine dignitary curopalates in 954. Sumbat is commemorated in the church inscriptions from Ishkhani and Doliskana in what is now Artvin Province, Turkey.

References

958 deaths
Kings of Bagratid Iberia
Bagrationi dynasty of Iberia
10th-century monarchs in Asia
10th-century monarchs of Georgia
Year of birth unknown
Kouropalatai